Doborji (also Romanized as Doborjī; also known as Sefīd Do Borjī) is a village in Sar Firuzabad Rural District, Firuzabad District, Kermanshah County, Kermanshah Province, Iran. At the 2006 census, its population was 78, in 18 families.

References 

Populated places in Kermanshah County